The Executed Renaissance, An Anthology, 1917–1933: Poetry, prose, drama and essay is an anthology of works by Ukrainian poets and prosaists of the 1920s and 1930s. The term's origin is attributed to the Ukrainian émigré and literary critic Yuriy Lavrinenko, who published the anthology in 1959 in Paris with the support of Jerzy Giedroyc, a Polish writer and activist.

The anthology itself is based on the idea of the "Executed Renaissance," which Giedroyc coined to describe the hundreds of writers—both Ukrainian literati and intellectuals—who were arrested and executed under Joseph Stalin. This cultural elite became a target during the Great Terror (August 1937 to November 1938) because they were in a position to expose oppression and betrayal and could quickly become the targets of treason themselves. During the 1917 Revolution, the works of the poets were popular features and rallying chants. The body of literature was also recognized for its contribution to the emergence of the modern Ukrainian national idea.

The history of publication 
Lavrinenko was recommended to Giedroyc by Yurii Shevelov as a suitable compiler of an anthology of Ukrainian literature of the 1920s and 1930s.

The book appeared in the library of the Parisian magazine Kultura in 1959. The term "Executed Renaissance" is attributed to Giedroyc. It was first suggested as a title for the collection in a letter from Giedroyc to Shevelov dated 13 August 1958:

"And what about the name. It would be better to give as a common name The Executed Renaissance, An Anthology (1917–1933) etc. Such a name would have an effective sound. On the other hand, the humble title Anthology could only take the sting out of its promotion through the Iron Curtain. What do you think?"

After publication, Giedroyc sent copies, at the publisher's expense, to the Ukrainian Writers' Union in Kyiv and to magazines in the Ukrainian SSR. He used the ability of Kultura (legal or not) to send books through the Iron Curtain. After the anthology appeared, the term "Executed Renaissance" gained widespread notoriety in Ukrainian public language.

Materials for the anthology were taken from contemporary periodicals, libraries and archives, such as the Archive-Museum of the Ukrainian Free Academy of Sciences, the New York Public Library's Department of Slavic Studies, and from private collections (Sviatoslav Hordynsky, Hryhorii Kostiuk, Volodymyr Miakovsky, Yosyp Hirniak, Oksana Burevii and others), and from handwritten copies. In addition, Shevelov, Leonid Lyman, Ivan Koshelivets, Vasyl Barka, Vasyl Hryshko, Yar Slavutych and others helped to track down materials and offered advice.

Structure of anthology 
Ina  preface to the edition, Lavrinenko, its editor, wrote about principium and the technique of choosing:
In this collected edition appeared only material, which had been publishing (rarely — only wrote) in Ukraine — mainly in USSR — for period 1917—1933 and which had banned and destroyed after 1933 due to new Moscow's course and turning Ukraine into colonial province.

Lavrinenko noted that part of the banned works had been printed during the occupation of Eastern Ukraine—between 1939-1946 and between 1956 and 1958—but it contained some corrections. The main principum was "to give only works, which had withdrawn after Moscow's terroristic and famine crack-downs on Ukraine." Works that were written in emigration were not represented because "this is anthology of works, which was in UkrSSR before 1933."

The anthology consists of four chapters: poetry, prose, drama and essay. Poetry was represented most fully: Firstly, because it "was in vanguard of contemporary literature;" and secondly, because "it is unpossible to cover even the most important examples of prose, drama and essay." Authors were placed «"n order of appearance of their first book after 1917."

Poetry 
 Pavlo Tychyna — poems from collections «Sun Clarnets», «Instead of Sonnets and Octaves», «Plough», «A Wind from Ukraine», «In the Cosmic Orchestra», poems «To the Memory of Thirty» (published in Nova Rada, 1918), «From the Crimean Cycle» (dedicated to M. Rylsky) («The Life and the Revolution», 1926), «Mother peeled potato...» (almanac «Vaplite», 1926)
 Maksym Rylsky — poems from collections «Under Autumn Stars», «A Blue Distance», «Poems», «Through the Windstorm and Snow», «Thirteenth Spring», «Where Roads Cross», «The Sound and the Echo»; translation of preface of Adam Mickiewicz's «Pan Tadeusz»
 Yakiv Savchenko — poems «He Will Come on Mad Horse at the Night»(«Poetry», 1918), «He Stands as a Wax and Cries Mournfull...» (Bohdan Kravtsiv's anthology «Strings, Putted Down», 1955), «A Sun Under Heads» (Yar Slavutych's martyrology «The Executed Muse», 1955)
 Dmytro Zahul — poems «On the Other Side of Impenetrable Cover» (Literature and Science Herald, 1919), I am Listening a Song as through a Dream... (Bohdan Kravtsiv's anthology «Strings, Putted Down», 1955)
 Mykhayl Semenko — poems «Bronze Body», «Conductor», «Ocean» («Strings, Putted Down», 1955), «Unavoidable Days» («Piero peacocks», 1918)
 Oleksa Slisarenko — poems «Walt Whitman», «In the Apiary»(«Strings, Putted Down», 1955), «To the Memory of Hnat Mykhailychenko» («An Alarm», 1921),   «A Rime» («Vaplite», 1927)
 Mykola Zerov — poems from collections «Camenae» (1924) and «Sonnetarium» (1948) and single poem «HOI TRIAKONTA» (Yurii Klen (Oswald Burghardt) «Remembrance about Neoclassіcists», 1947)
 Vasyl Chumak
 Maik Yohansen
 Volodymyr Sosiura
 Volodymyr Svidzynsky
 Pavlo Phylypovych
 Todosii Osmachka
 Geo Shkurupii
 Dmytro Phalkivsky
 Vasyl Bobynsky
 Mykhailo Drai-Khmara
 Yevhen Pluzhnyk
 Leonid Chernov (Maloshyichenko)
 Stepan Ben
 Mykola Bazhan
 Marko Vorony
 Vasyl Mysyk
 Oleksa Vlyzko
 Kost Burevii (Eduard Strikha)

Prose 
 Mykola Khvylovy — «Editor Kark», «I am (A Romantic)»
 Valerian Pidmohylny — «Ivan Bosy»
 Hryhorii Kosynka — «A Form» (fragment)
 Ivan Senchenko — «From Kholui's Notes»
 Borys Antonenko-Davydovych — «A Death»
 Yurii Yanovsky — «Four Swords»
 Ostap Vyshnia — «My Autobiography» (sic!), «Chukren», «Chukhrainians», «Something from Ukrainian Studies»

Drama 
 Mykola Kulish — «People's Malachii» (appeared in Stanislav Hordynsky's «Real People's Malachii», 1953)
 Kost Burevii — historic drama «Pavlo Polubotok» in five acts (Kost Burevii «Pavlo Polubotok», 1948)

Essay 
 Andrii Nikovsky — «Vita nova» (fragments; 1929)
 Yurii Mezhenko — «The Individuum's Creativity and the Collective» (fragments; «Muzahet», 1919), «A VAPLITE's Proclamation» (saved in Apkadii Liubchenko's archive)
 Mykola Khvylovy — fragments from pamphlets «Quo Vadis», «Upstream Thoughts» (appendix of «News of VUTsVK» «Culture and Life», 1925), «Apologists of Pysarism» («Culture and Life», 1926), «Ukraine or Little Russia?» (Andrii Khvylia «From the Flank — to the Abyss», 1928)
 Mykola Zerov — «Eurasian Renaissance and Poshekhonye Pines»(«Culture and Life», 1926)
 Volodymyr Yurynets — «Dialogs» (Interludes to 135th book of «Literature Fair», briefly) («Literature Fair», 1929)
 Oleksander Dovzhenko — «To the Problem of Visual Arts» («Vaplite», 1926)
 Les Kurbas — «Ways of „Berezil”» («Vaplite», 1927)
 Mykhailo Hrushevsky — «In Shameful Memory» («Ukraine», 1926)

See also

 Executed Renaissance (the shooting of Ukrainian writers, poets, artists and dramatists)
 List of Ukrainian-language poets
 List of Ukrainian-language writers
 Ukrainian literature

References

Literature 
 О.С. Рубльов. Енциклопедія історії України : у 10 т. / редкол.: В. А. Смолій (голова) та ін. ; Інститут історії України НАН України. — К. : Наук. думка, 2012. — Т. 9 : Прил — С. — С. 265. — .

Bibliography 
 Лавріненко Ю. А. Розстріляне відродження: Антологія 1917—1933: Поезія — проза — драма — есей / Підгот. тексту, фахове редагування і передм. проф. Наєнка М. К. — К.: Вид. центр «Просвіта», 2001. — 794 с.
 Розстріляне відродження: Антологія 1917 — 1933: Поезія — проза — драма — есей / Упорядкув., передм., післям.  — Ю. Лавріненка.; Післямова Є. Сверстюка. — К.: Смолоскип, 2008. — 976 с.: портр.
 Простір свободи. Україна на шпальтах паризької «Культури». Підготувала Богуміла Бердиховська. К.: Критика — 2005 р., 528 с.
 Єжи Ґедройць — українська еміґрація. Листування 1952—1982 років. Упорядкування, переднє слово і коментарі Боґуміли Бердиховської. — Київ: Критика, 2008 (див. листування з Юрієм Лавріненком у справі підготовки антології «Розстріляне відродження»)

Ukrainian-language books
1959 anthologies
Ukrainian books